USS Helianthus (SP-585) was a patrol vessel in commission in the United States Navy from 1917 to 1919, seeing service in World War I. After her U.S. Navy service, she was in commission in the United States Coast and Geodetic Survey as the survey launch USC&GS Helianthus from 1919 to 1939. She was named after the Helianthus, the genus to which the sunflower belongs.

Construction
Helianthus was designed by Nathanael Greene Herreshoff and built by the Herreshoff Manufacturing Company as a power yacht at Bristol, Rhode Island. Helianthus, yard number 288, official number 210121, was launched on 17 June 1912. Registry information for 1913 shows the yacht with home port of Bristol, gasoline powered at 50 indicated horsepower, with signal letters LCKT,  registered length,  breadth,  depth with a crew, excluding master, of three.

United States Navy service, 1917–1919

The U.S. Navy acquired Helianthus from her owner, N. A. Herreshoff, on 11 June 1917 for World War I service as a patrol vessel and commissioned her on 6 July 1917 as USS Helianthus (SP-585).

Helianthus was assigned to section patrol duty in the 2nd Naval District in southern New England during World War I. She operated on harbor patrol and harbor entrance patrol in Narragansett Bay and at Newport, Rhode Island.

Helianthus collided with the fishing vessel T.H.C. on 12 June 1918 off Warren, Rhode Island. The owner of T.H.C., the Warren Oyster Company, filed for $3,840.56 in damages, but was granted only $50.00 in compensation by the United States Congress.

United States Coast and Geodetic Survey service, 1919–1939
The U.S. Navy transferred Helianthus to the United States Coast and Geodetic Survey on 28 March 1919. Commissioned as USC&GS Helianthus, she served as a survey launch during her years with the Coast and Geodetic Survey, conducting hydrographic survey work primarily in the waters of the Territory of Alaska.

After undergoing repairs, Helianthus began survey operations. Her first survey season was in 1920, during which she served along with another former U.S. Navy section patrol boat,  USC&GS Scandinavia, and a  launch as a tender to the survey ship [[USC&GS Explorer (1904)|USC&GS Explorer]] in triangulation, topographic and hydrographic surveys in Stephens Passage in the Alexander Archipelago in Southeast Alaska.

The Coast and Geodetic Survey sold Helianthus'' in 1939, and her subsequent fate is unknown. The Survey replaced her in 1940 with the survey vessel USC&GS Lester Jones (ASV-79).

Notes

References

External links
 Helianthus July 8, 1914. Off Newport during Trial of Cup Defenders. (Herreshoff Marine Museum Collection)
 "Helianthus I'' ca. 1915. (Herreshoff Marine Museum Collection)
 Construction plan (Herreshoff Marine Museum Collection)

NavSource Online: Patrol Yacht Photo Archive: USC&GS Helianthus ex-USS (SP 585)
NOAA History, A Science Odyssey: Tools of the Trade: Ships: Coast and Geodetic Survey Ships: Helianthus

Patrol vessels of the United States Navy
World War I patrol vessels of the United States
Ships of the United States Coast and Geodetic Survey
Ships transferred from the United States Navy to the United States Coast and Geodetic Survey
Survey ships of the United States
Ships built in Bristol, Rhode Island
1912 ships
Maritime incidents in 1918